Benjamin Mendes da Costa (17 July 1803 - 26 November 1868) was an English merchant and philanthropist. Da Costa was born in Enfield, London, to Benjamin Mendes da Costa and his second wife, Louisa. Although da Costa's father was a Jew, the children of his second marriage were brought up as members of the Church of England.

In July 1840, da Costa emigrated to the newly settled colony of South Australia, becoming a successful merchant on Hindley Street. He acquired  of land in the city centre, as well as fifteen country sections. He was elected to the committee of the Merchant's Institute, and became good friends with the colonial chaplain, James Farrell, and Bishop Augustus Short. Da Costa left the colony in 1848, returning to London. He died of lung cancer in November 1868.

In his will, da Costa bequeathed his South Australian landholdings to St Peter's College, Adelaide. The estate was subject to the life interests of ten relations; the last died in 1910 upon which time the property was vested in the school. St Peter's has named a hall, a house and a scholarship in his honour.

References

Settlers of South Australia
1868 deaths
Deaths from lung cancer in England
People from Enfield, London
1803 births
English people of Portuguese-Jewish descent